Elizabeth Duke is the name of:

Elizabeth A. Duke (born 1952), member of the Board of Governors of the Federal Reserve System
Elizabeth Ann Duke (born 1940), wanted FBI domestic terrorist fugitive 
Elizabeth Duke (administrator), former administrator for the Health Resources and Services Administration (HRSA)
Elizabeth Duke (author), pen name of Vivienne Wallington
Elizabeth Duke, a brand owned by Argos, formerly used for its jewellery range